Brutus Junius Clay (July 1, 1808 – October 11, 1878) was a U.S. Representative from Kentucky, and a son of Green Clay. His brother Cassius Marcellus Clay also was a politician in the state, and they both joined the Unionist Party at the time of the American Civil War.

Early life and education
Born in Richmond, Kentucky to Green Clay and his wife Sally Lewis (died 1867), Clay attended the common schools. One of six children who survived to adulthood out of seven born, Brutus had sisters Elizabeth Lewis Clay (1798–1887), Pauline, Rodes and Sallie, an older brother Sidney, and younger brother Cassius Marcellus Clay (b.1810).

In 1815 Elizabeth married John Speed Smith, who also became a politician in Kentucky, as did their son Green Clay Smith.

Brutus Clay graduated from Centre College, Danville, Kentucky. He entered into agricultural pursuits and stock raising. His father, who had interests in tens of thousands of acres of land, distilleries and ferries, was considered one of the wealthiest men in Kentucky and had become an influential politician.

In 1827 Brutus Clay settled in Bourbon County, where he became deeply involved in agriculture and breeding livestock. He became recognized in central Kentucky as one of its "most successful stock raisers." It as a key part of the Inner Bluegrass region economy.

Marriage and family
Having gotten established, on February 10, 1831, Clay married Amelia Field (1812–1843) of Madison County, daughter of Ezekiel H. and Patsy (Irvine) Field. They had four children: Martha, Christopher Field, Green, and Ezekiel Field Clay. The latter served as a colonel in the Confederate Army during the Civil War. Afterward he went into stock raising, particularly of Thoroughbreds.

The widower Clay married again on November 8, 1844, to Ann Field (1822–1881), a sister of his first wife Amelia. They had one son, Cassius M. Clay, who lived at the Clay homestead in Bourbon County after his parents' deaths.

Political career
Clay was elected in 1840 as a member of the Kentucky House of Representatives. His younger brother Cassius also became a politician in the state.

That year, Clay was also elected president of Bourbon County Agricultural Association, which he served for thirty years.  He served as president of the Kentucky Agricultural Association 1853–1861.

In 1860 Clay was elected again as a member of the Kentucky House of Representatives. During the American Civil War, Clay and his brother were Unionists. He was elected as a Unionist to the Thirty-eighth Congress, serving March 4, 1863 – March 3, 1865.  He served as chairman of the Committee on Agriculture (Thirty-eighth Congress).

He was not a candidate for reelection and returned to Kentucky to resume his former pursuits. He died near Paris, Kentucky on October 11, 1878. He was interred in his family burial ground at "Auvergne," near Paris.

References

1808 births
1878 deaths
Members of the United States House of Representatives from Kentucky
Centre College alumni
Farmers from Kentucky
Green Clay family
People from Bourbon County, Kentucky
Members of the Kentucky House of Representatives
People from Richmond, Kentucky
Kentucky Unionists
Unionist Party members of the United States House of Representatives
19th-century American politicians